Walk Glacier is a glacier descending westward from Christoffersen Heights, to the south of Forbidden Rocks, in the Jones Mountains. Mapped by the University of Minnesota Jones Mountains Party, 1960–61. Named by Advisory Committee on Antarctic Names (US-ACAN) for Lieutenant Donald R. Walk, U.S. Navy, medical officer and officer in charge of Byrd Station, 1961.

See also
 List of glaciers in the Antarctic
 Glaciology

External links
 

Glaciers of Ellsworth Land